Fredericton is the capital city of the Canadian province of New Brunswick. The city is situated in the west-central portion of the province along the Saint John River, also known by its Indigenous name of Wolastoq, which flows west to east as it bisects the city. The river is the dominant natural feature of the area. One of the main urban centres in New Brunswick, the city had a population of 63,116 and a metropolitan population of 108,610 in the 2021 Canadian Census. It is the third-largest city in the province after Moncton and Saint John.

On 1 January 2023, Fredericton annexed parts of five local service districts; revised census figures have not been released.

An important cultural, artistic, and educational centre for the province, Fredericton is home to two universities, the New Brunswick College of Craft and Design, and cultural institutions such as the Beaverbrook Art Gallery, the Fredericton Region Museum, and The Playhouse, a performing arts venue. The city hosts the annual Harvest Jazz & Blues Festival, attracting regional and international jazz, blues, rock, and world artists. Fredericton is also an important and vibrant centre point for the region's top visual artists; many of New Brunswick's notable artists live and work there today. Fredericton has also been home to some great historical Canadian painters as well, including Goodridge Roberts, and Molly and Bruno Bobak.

As a provincial capital, its economy is tied to the public sector; however, the city also contains a growing IT and commercial sector. The city has the highest percentage of residents with post-secondary education in the province and the highest per capita income of any city in New Brunswick.

History

There is archaeological evidence of a camp in the area 12,000 years ago, and Maliseets farmed several kilometres upriver.

Colonists from the Kingdom of France in the late 1600s built Fort Nashwaak on the north side of the Saint John River, as the capital of Acadia. It withstood a British attack in 1696, but the capital was later moved to Port Royal. In 1713, Acadians escaping the British takeover of Nova Scotia settled the site, naming it Pointe Ste-Anne. It was destroyed in 1758 when the population of about 83 were exiled during the expulsion of the Acadians.

It was in 1783, when United Empire Loyalists arrived from New England, that the history of modern Fredericton began. The following year, New Brunswick was partitioned from Nova Scotia and became its own colony. Pointe-Ste-Anne was renamed "Fredericstown", after Frederick, second son of King George III. It became the capital of the new colony, being considered to have a better defensive position than larger Saint John.

The streets were laid out in the typical grid pattern of the time, with the names reflecting loyalist tendencies: Charlotte, Brunswick, George, King, and Queen.

In 1785, it became the shire town of York County. In 1790 the New Brunswick Legislative Building was constructed. As a centre of government, it attracted educational institutions, with King's College (now the University of New Brunswick) being the first English-language university in Canada, and religious institutions, with Christ Church Cathedral being built as the seat of the Anglican Diocese of Fredericton in 1853.

It was a British garrison town from 1784 to 1869, and the military compound is preserved as a National Historic Site of Canada.

With the New Brunswick Equal Opportunity program in the 1960s, county councils were abolished, and government services were centralized provincially in Fredericton, increasing jobs and population.

Geography

The Saint John River runs through Fredericton, with most of the city's post-war suburban development occurring on the gently sloping hills on either side of the river (although the downtown core is flat and lies low to the river).

It differs markedly from the geologically older parts of the province. There are prominently two distinct areas in the region that are divided around the area of Wilsey Road, in the east end of the city. In the west side, the bedrock underneath the earth is topographically dominant, whereas the other is controlled by Pleistocene and recent deposits leading to the rivers (resulting in the area being shallow and wide). Fredericton and its surroundings are rich in water resources, which, coupled with highly arable soil, make the Fredericton region ideal for agriculture. The Saint John River and one of its major tributaries, the Nashwaak River, come together in Fredericton. The uninhabited parts of the city are heavily forested.

Climate 

Fredericton has a humid continental climate (Dfb) with short, warm summers and long, cold winters.

Demographics

The 2021 census reported that immigrants (individuals born outside Canada) comprise 7,790 persons or 12.6% of the total population of Fredericton. Of the total immigrant population, the top countries of origin were United Kingdom (765 persons or 9.8%), China (645 persons or 8.3%), United States of America (570 persons or 7.3%), Syria (505 persons or 6.5%), Philippines (500 persons or 6.4%), India (460 persons or 5.9%), Egypt (300 persons or 3.9%), Iran (245 persons or 3.1%), Lebanon (205 persons or 2.6%), and Democratic Republic of the Congo (180 persons or 2.3%).

Ethnicity 
In 2021, Fredericton was 82.5% white/European, 3.5% Indigenous and 14.0% visible minorities. The largest visible minority groups were Black (2.9%), South Asian (2.9%), Arab (2.5%), Chinese (1.8%) and Filipino (1.0%).

Fredericton accepted the highest number of refugees from the Syrian Civil War per capita of any Canadian city.

Language 
English is spoken as a mother tongue by 80.2% of residents. Other mother tongues spoken are French (6.1%), Arabic (2.1%), Chinese languages (1.4%), Spanish (0.7%), Russian (0.6%), and Persian languages (0.5%). 1.4% of the population listed both English and French as mother tongues.

Religion 
According to the 2021 census, religious groups in Fredericton included:
Christianity (32,295 persons or 52.2%)
Irreligion (25,150 persons or 40.7%)
Islam (2,305 persons or 3.7%)
Hinduism (820 persons or 1.3%)
Buddhism (225 persons or 0.4%)
Sikhism (190 persons or 0.3%)
Judaism (160 persons or 0.3%)
Indigenous Spirituality (15 persons or <0.1%)
Other (670 persons or 1.1%)

Those who declare a religion are predominantly Protestant. Fredericton has a synagogue, a mosque, a Hindu temple, a Unitarian fellowship, and a Shambhala Buddhist meditation centre.

Economy
The Government of New Brunswick and the universities are the primary employers. The policies of centralizing provincial government functions during the 1960s led to an expansion of the population.

The 1960s also saw an expansion of the University of New Brunswick due to increased post-war university enrolment, as well as the construction of Saint Thomas University. The Law School, now the University of New Brunswick Faculty of Law moved from Saint John to the Fredericton area.

The city has been investing actively in IT infrastructure. The City of Fredericton won the "Judges Innovation Award" at the 2004 Canadian Information Productivity Awards due to their "Fred-eZone" free municipality wide Wi-Fi initiative. This and other innovations by the city's utelco, e-Novations, led Intel to do a case study on their successes. Fred-eZone spans much of the city's downtown and parts of surrounding residential areas, as well as peripheral commercial areas such as Fredericton's Regent Mall. In 2008 and 2009 the Intelligent Community Forum selected Fredericton as a Top 7 Intelligent Community, based partly on the city's work in the IT sector.

Arts and culture

The Playhouse is the main venue for Theatre New Brunswick, the province's largest professional theatre company.

Festivals include the Harvest Jazz & Blues Festival, the New Brunswick Summer Music Festival, the Silver Wave Film Festival and Symphony New Brunswick.

Fredericton has a long literary tradition, having been home to Jonathan Odell, Charles G. D. Roberts, Bliss Carman, and Francis Sherman. Writers living in Fredericton include Raymond Fraser, Herb Curtis, David Adams Richards, Mark Anthony Jarman, and Gerard Beirne.

Fredericton's beloved fountain "Freddy the Nude Dude", officially known as "Putto with Fish" sits outside City Hall at 397 Queen St. "Freddy the Nude Dude" was donated to the city by Mayor George Edward Fentey, in 1885. The statue depicts a nude Cherub and is a beloved fixture of downtown Fredericton. The famed statue has had some trouble since its historic arrival in 1885. In January 2013, "Freddy the Nude Dude" was taken south to Alabama for a replication of the original statue after 128 winters worth of damage. The original Freddy is kept safely inside City Hall where it is protected from further weather damage.

Architecture
Styles range from Victorian to modern. There are 12 National Historic Sites of Canada.

Museums and historic buildings

 Beaverbrook Art Gallery
 New Brunswick Legislative Building
 Old Government House
 Fredericton Region Museum
 Christ Church Cathedral
 New Brunswick Sports Hall of Fame
 Science East
 Sir Howard Douglas Hall (Old Arts Building)
 William Brydone Jack Observatory
 St. Anne's Chapel
 Fort Nashwaak
 Fredericton City Hall
 Marysville Cotton Mill
 Centennial Building

Sports
There are no professional sports teams in Fredericton, although both universities have extensive athletic programs. The UNB Reds play in the Atlantic University Sport conference of U Sports and St. Thomas Tommies play in the Atlantic Collegiate Athletic Association conference of the Canadian Collegiate Athletic Association for most sports, although their women's hockey team, cross-country teams, and track & field teams play in the Atlantic University Sports conference of U Sports.

Fredericton's high schools compete in a variety of sports in the New Brunswick Interscholastic Athletic Association.

UNB's men's hockey team are 8 time National Champions, and the highest attended sporting events in the city.

The Junior A hockey team is the Fredericton Red Wings. The former Fredericton Express and Fredericton Canadiens were American Hockey League teams.

Each summer the Fredericton Loyalists  host the New Brunswick Timber team which competes in the Rugby Canada Super League.

Parks and recreation
 Carleton Park, part of the Northside Riverfront Trail, includes a boat launching area. The park, which was once the site of Alexander "Boss" Gibson's rail yard.
 The Green, along the north and south banks of the Saint John River, a walking and biking trail.
 Killarney Lake Park, a lakeside park with a beach and picnic spots as well as an extensive network of nature trails.
 Odell Park, features preserved forested areas, trails, spaces for picnics and gatherings, and the Fredericton Botanic Garden .st
 Officers' Square is a venue for outdoor concerts and has an outdoor skating rink in the winter.
 Queen Square Park, in the heart of Downtown Fredericton.
 Reading Park is a  passive use park incorporating an open meadow, and a  walking trail through an old-growth forest. The park's old-growth forest is one of the city's last remaining habitats for the pileated woodpecker.
 Wilmot Park - a recreational park downtown.

Trail system
Many of the city trails are rail trails that follow old railway lines. The rail trail system in Fredericton is part of the Sentier NB Trail system and some of these trails are also part of the larger Trans-Canada Trail network.

Government

Fredericton has a non-partisan and Mayor–council government. The mayor and council serve four-year terms with elections in May. The city is divided into 12 wards, (six on each side of the river, one councillor per ward.

The city includes the provincial ridings of Fredericton North, Fredericton-Grand Lake, Fredericton West-Hanwell, Oromocto-Lincoln-Fredericton, New Maryland-Sunbury and Fredericton South, which in 2014 elected the first-ever MLA for the Green Party of New Brunswick, party leader David Coon.

Federally, the city forms most of the riding of Fredericton.

Education and research
The Anglophone West School District and the District Scolaire Francophone Sud (District 1) run schools including Fredericton High School, École des Bâtisseurs, and the École Sainte-Anne. Leo Hayes High School is a public–private partnership

There are two universities, the UNB, and St. Thomas, the province's only Catholic university.

Colleges include the New Brunswick College of Craft and Design, the New Brunswick Community College, and the Maritime College of Forest Technology.

For-profit universities include University of Fredericton and Yorkville University.

The Hugh John Flemming Forestry Centre researches in forestry management. Fredericton's Provincial Research Organization specializes in aquaculture, mining, manufacturing, energy and the environment.

Transportation
Air service is provided out of the Fredericton International Airport.

Fredericton Transit provides bus service, though not on Sundays.

Fredericton started installing bicycle lanes in July 2008.

Passenger rail service ended in the 1960s, and freight in 1996. All railway tracks have been abandoned and removed.

Fredericton is served by the Maritime Bus fleet which provides connections to points throughout Eastern Canada.

The Trans-Canada Highway passes along the southern municipal boundary. Routes 7 and 8 (the latter being a former alignment of the Trans-Canada) also pass through the city. Two highway bridges, the Westmorland Street Bridge and the Princess Margaret Bridge, cross the Saint John River. Those bridges feed into controlled-access roads (Routes 8 and 105 serving the city's north side).

Gallery

Notes

References

Further reading
 Dallison, Robert L. "A Tour of Boss Gibson's Marysville: A Nineteenth Century Mill Town." Fredericton Heritage Trust, 1991.
 Hachey, Philip Osmond "The geology and ground water of the Fredericton district." UNB Thesis, 1955.
 McIntyre, Glen, Bruce Oliver and Bob Watson, "A Valuable and Important Place - Fredericton's Loyalist Origins 1783." A Fredericton Historical Research Project, 1983.

See also
People from Fredericton
 Gangnam-gu, South Korea: partner city

Imperial Order Daughters of the Empire (IODE), the first chapter of which was formed in Fredericton on 15 January 1900
List of cities in Canada
Fredericton Public Library
Nashwaaksis
Media in Fredericton
The Playhouse
Dr. Everett Chalmers Regional Hospital
Douglas
Hanwell
Marysville
Nashwaaksis

External links

 
Cities in New Brunswick
Former colonial capitals in Canada
Greater Fredericton
Populated places established in 1785
New Brunswick populated places on the Saint John River (Bay of Fundy)